Pammal K. Sambandam is a 2002 Indian Tamil-language comedy film directed by Moulee and scripted by Crazy Mohan. The film stars Kamal Haasan in the title role alongside Abbas, Simran and Sneha. The film was produced by P. L. Thenappan under Media Dreams, while Deva composed the music.

Pammal K. Sambandam released on 14 January 2002. It received positive reviews and became a commercial success. It was later remade in Hindi as Kambakkht Ishq in 2009.

Plot 
When a stuntman Pammal Kalyana Sambandham alias P.K.S and a reputed surgeon Dr. Janaki come across each other at his younger brother Anand's and her best friend Malathi's elopement, they instantly develop a dislike for each other. They both have a very low opinion of the opposite gender, and also refuse to believe in the concept of marriage. Sambandham humorously often censors his middle name "Kalyana" as it means "marriage". Janaki, in particular, hates Sambandham for his uncouth manners and language. She gets Sambandam arrested when he argues with her at the police station over Anand and Malathi's marriage. Sambandham is eventually released on bail.

Anand and Malathi's marriage soon turns rocky as Malathi feels that Anand had lied to her over a job assignment in Australia before they had eloped. On the advices of Janaki, Malathi harasses Anand at every opportunity and makes him do the household work. On hearing about Anand's plight, Sambandham decides to fix the relationship by "hooking up" Anand with a woman named Vanaja in order to make Malathi jealous and a more caring and dutiful wife to Anand. But, unfortunately for Anand, Janaki makes Malathi to believe that Anand is cheating on her and forces her to file for divorce.

Meanwhile, Janaki tries to get Sambandham into trouble by barging into a movie shoot involving Sambandham and claiming that he is "involved" in animal cruelty since he is using a bull and a snake as part of the movie. In the chaos which was accidentally created by Janaki as she accidentally throws the snake on to the bull's head, the bull goes mad, the snake gets killed and the bull gores Sambandham in his stomach when he was trying save Janaki from the bull as it was trying to attack her. Janaki performs an emergency surgery on him and saves his life, but during the surgery, her prized possession (a wristwatch gifted to her by her aunt) falls into his stomach, which is detected by the X-Ray. She pretends to become close with Sambandham, with the intention to somehow sedate him and perform the surgery again to retrieve the watch. Sambandham, who is unaware that Janaki's watch is in his stomach due to a mix-up with another patient's X-Ray, mistakes Janaki's romantic overtures to be genuine, and falls in love with her. He also inadvertently foils all her plans to sedate him. Eventually, Sambandham provides another shock to Janaki; they are to be engaged at his grandfather's house. During the engagement ceremony, Janaki finally manages to sedate Sambandham and retrieve her watch. Following the surgery, Janaki reveals the truth to Sambandham and ends their engagement, leaving Sambandham heartbroken. Sambandham's troubles increase when he realises that his grandfather had signed a legal document transferring his lodge to him once he is married. When his grandfather finds out that Janaki cancelled the engagement, he suffers a massive heart attack and dies. Meanwhile, Malathi and Anand manage to reconcile and get back together, cancelling their divorce.

Janaki feels guilty over being responsible for Sambandham's grandfather's death. She also finds out that Sambandham had decided to transfer the ownership of the lodge to her and convert it to an orphanage if they had got married, and on this revelation, she realises that she has fallen in love with him. She decides to confess her love to Sambandham, but instead she inadvertently convinces him to marry his relative, a weightlifter Rajeshwari alias Raji, within the next two days, as he would lose the possession of the lodge if he doesn't marry by then. However, it turns out that Raji has no interest in the marriage and is in love with a Malayali boy. In a hilarious climax, Sambandham, Janaki, Anand and Malathi help Raji in eloping with her boyfriend, and Sambandham and Janaki too elope as well, thus ensuring that the lodge remains under Sambandham's ownership.

Cast 

 Kamal Haasan as Pammal Kalyana Sambandam (P.K.S)
 Simran as Dr. G. Janaki, a doctor as well as social worker (Voice dubbed by Savitha Reddy)
 Abbas as Anand, Sambandam's younger brother
 Sneha as Malathi, Anand's lover turned wife
 Manivannan as Rajeshwari's father
 Ravichandran as Sambandam's uncle
 Ramesh Khanna as Biscuit Kanna
 Vaiyapuri as Dili
 Sriman as Malathi's brother
 Charle as Sambandam's Lawyer
 Unnikrishnan Namboothiri as Sambandham's grandfather
 Santhana Bharathi as Sambandam's uncle
 R. S. Shivaji
 Bayilvan Ranganathan as Mudhaliyar Sangam member
 Madhan Bob as Srivilliputhur Kulasekara Periyasamy (S.K.P.)
 Yugi Sethu as himself
 T. P. Gajendran as Film director
 Balu Anand as Police Inspector
 Kavithalaya Krishnan as lift operator
 Neelu as Police inspector
 Scissor Manohar as owner of Snake
 Nellai Siva as Mudhaliyar Sangam member
 Singamuthu as Mudhaliyar Sangam member
 M. N. Rajam
 S. N. Parvathy
 Sukumari as Alaram Mami
 Kalpana as Koorkenchery Mariya Kutty Thomas (K.M.T)
 Kuyili
 Nithya Ravindran as Rajeshwari's mother
 C. R. Saraswathi as Malathi's mother
 K. S. Jayalakshmi
 Jaya Murali
 Crazy Mohan as ENT doctor (cameo)

Production 
Kamal Haasan initially approached Moulee to make a film for his own production house, but efforts were fruitless. Subsequently, the film was started under P. L. Thenappan in August 2001 and the shoot was complete within three months. The film's invitation card for the launch was shaped in the form of the alphabet "K", which formed a significant theme throughout the film. The card also featured images of Devayani who was later replaced in the film by Sneha. Devayani was removed after she went on honeymoon following her sudden marriage and thus she was unable to fulfil her original schedules. Kamal Haasan's character was a stunt double under Vikram Dharma in the film and the stunt director had used the air-ramp for the first time in a Tamil film. During the making of the film, the significance of the initial "K" was hidden before Kamal Haasan revealed at a press conference two weeks before release that it stood for "Kalyanam" (Marriage), which the lead characters despised. The title was inspired by Pammal Sambandha Mudaliar, who was considered as one of the fathers of Tamil theatre.

Soundtrack 
The music was composed by Deva and lyrics for all songs were written by Vaali, Kabilan, Pa. Vijay and Kamal Haasan. The song "Kandhasamy Maadasamy", written and sung by Haasan, has his character teasing a friend who is in a troubled marriage.

Release and reception 
Pammal K. Sambandam was released on 14 January 2002, Pongal day, and became a major commercial success, easily recovering its investment due to the low budget. Malathi Rangarajan of The Hindu claimed that "if Mouli had sustained the humorous strain throughout, PKS would have turned out to be a complete comic treat from start to finish. Why he did not do it remains a riddle." The critic also praised the lead performances and Crazy Mohan's dialogue writing. Rajita of Rediff.com described it as "an average film", stating that the only "real highpoint is 'Crazy' Mohan's dialogues". BizHat said, "While Pammal K Sambantham does provide good humor, it falls short to be considered as a full-length comedy movie because of its unbalanced mix of drama and humor". Visual Dasan of Kalki wrote called the film "above average", saying Deva's music did not help the film in any major way, but Mohan's dialogues and Moulee's direction were the film's saving graces.

References

External links 
 

2000s Tamil-language films
2002 comedy films
2002 films
Films about filmmaking
Films about stunt performers
Films directed by T. S. B. K. Moulee
Films scored by Deva (composer)
Films shot in New Zealand
Films with screenplays by Crazy Mohan
Indian comedy films
Tamil films remade in other languages